The Basilica of Our Lady Help of Christians is a church in Turin, northern Italy.  Originally part of the home for poor boys founded by John Bosco, it now contains the remains of Bosco, and 6,000 relics of other saints.

History
John Bosco commissioned the construction of the Basilica of Our Lady Help of Christians in order to coordinate all activities related to the Salesians in the Valdocco suburb. According to legend, a vision of the Virgin Mary appeared in a dream to Bosco in 1844 or 1845 and revealed the site of the martyrdom of the Turinese saints Solutor, Adventor and Octavius. The church was built on the site of their death and houses the relics of these saints..

The church was designed by Antonio Spezia, who drew inspiration from the facade of San Giorgio Maggiore in Venice. It was built in 1865–1868 by Carlo Buzzetti (one of the first boys of the Oratory). The first stone was laid on 27 April 1865, in the presence of Prince Amedeo di Savoia.  The church was consecrated in 1868.

The basilica enshrines an image of the Blessed Virgin Mary under the title Mary Help of Christians. Pope Leo XIII granted a Canonical coronation to the painted image on 13 February 1903. The actual ceremony was carried out on 17 May 1903 via his Papal legate, Cardinal Agostino Richelmy.

The basilica holds the tombs of saints Don Bosco, Maria Domenica Mazzarello, and Dominic Savio.

See also
Basilica of Our Lady Help of Christians, Belmont Abbey
 Roman Catholic Marian churches

Notes

External links

Our Lady Help of Christians
Salesian churches in Italy
19th-century Roman Catholic church buildings in Italy